Phet Kanchanarom Park is a small public park in Bangkok, Thailand. It is close to The Mall Bangkae, Lak Song MRT Station and Kasemrad BK Hospital.

History
Originally, the park was on the plot of land owned by the Department of Highways. It has been left desolate and has no official name. It is therefore often referred to as "The Park in front of The Mall Bangkae" according to its location beside The Mall Bangkae shopping centre, with only Kanchanaphisek Road (Outer Ring Road) in the middle.

After the great flood in 2011, the park was restored with a budget of more than 10 million baht and was officially named "Phet Kanchanarom". The opening ceremony was held on September 30, 2014, chaired by MR Sukhumbhand Paribatra, Governor of Bangkok.

Its name means "The Pleasure Park of Phet Kasem and Kanchanaphisek" owing its location is the intersection of two roads, Phet Kasem (Highway 4) and Kanchanaphisek.

Park information
The park interior, there are recreation area, playground, small soccer and basketball court, takraw and badmintion court along with the ASEAN garden which is the national tree planting plot of ASEAN countries.

The most striking thing is a lake with a pier adorned with lampposts extending into it. At the end is a pavilion.

The park is open daily from 05.00 am to 09.00 pm.

Notes

External links

Parks in Bangkok
Bang Khae district
2014 establishments in Thailand